The Nuclear Energy Agency (NEA) is an intergovernmental agency that is organized under the Organisation for Economic Co-operation and Development (OECD). Originally formed on 1 February 1958 with the name European Nuclear Energy Agency (ENEA)—the United States participated as an Associate Member—the name was changed on 20 April 1972 to its current name after Japan became a member.

The mission of the NEA is to "assist its member countries in maintaining and further developing, through international co-operation, the scientific, technological and legal bases required for the safe, environmentally friendly and economical use of nuclear energy for peaceful purposes."

Members 
NEA currently consists of 34 countries from Europe, North America and the Asia-Pacific region. In 2021, Bulgaria accessioned to NEA as its most recent member. In 2022, following Russia's invasion of Ukraine, Russia's membership was suspended.

 (suspended)

Together they account for approximately 85% of the world’s installed nuclear capacity. Nuclear power accounts for almost a quarter of the electricity produced in NEA Member countries. The NEA works closely with the International Atomic Energy Agency (IAEA) in Vienna and with the European Commission in Brussels.

Within the OECD, there is close co-ordination with the International Energy Agency and the Environment Directorate, as well as contacts with other directorates, as appropriate.

Areas of work 

 Nuclear safety and regulation
 Nuclear energy development
 Radioactive waste management
 Radiation protection and public health
 Nuclear law and liability
 Nuclear science
 Data bank
 Information and communication
 European Nuclear Energy Tribunal

Structure 

Since 1 September 2014, the Director-General of the NEA is William D Magwood, IV, who replaced Luis E. Echávarri on this post. The NEA Secretariat serves seven specialised standing technical committees under the leadership of the Steering Committee for Nuclear Energy—the governing body of the NEA—which reports directly to the OECD Council.

The standing technical committees, representing each of the seven major areas of the Agency's programme, are composed of member country experts who are both contributors to the programme of work and beneficiaries of its results. The approach is highly cost-efficient as it enables the Agency to pursue an ambitious programme with a relatively small staff that co-ordinates the work. The substantive value of the standing technical committees arises from the numerous important functions they perform, including: providing a forum for in-depth exchanges of technical and programmatic information; stimulating development of useful information by initiating and carrying out co-operation/research on key problems; developing common positions, including "consensus opinions", on technical and policy issues; identifying areas where further work is needed and ensuring that NEA activities respond to real needs; organising joint projects to enable interested countries to carry out research on particular issues on a cost-sharing basis.

See also 
 International Energy Agency
 International Atomic Energy Agency
 European Organization for Nuclear Research

References

External links 
OECD Nuclear Energy Agency web page

International organizations based in France
International nuclear energy organizations
Nuclear organizations
Radiation protection organizations
OECD